Prionapteryx africalis is a moth in the family Crambidae. It was described by George Hampson in 1896. It is found in the Democratic Republic of the Congo and Ghana.

References

Ancylolomiini
Moths described in 1896